Peru competed at the 2019 World Aquatics Championships in Gwangju, South Korea from 12 to 28 July.

Open water swimming

Peru qualified one female open water swimmer.

Swimming

Peru entered four swimmers.

Men

Women

References

World Aquatics Championship
Nations at the 2019 World Aquatics Championships
2019